John Charles "Spider" Brackenborough (February 9, 1897 – July 8, 1993) was a Canadian professional hockey player left winger. He played 7 games for the Boston Bruins of the National Hockey League as well as in the NOHA, OHA-Sr, and OCHL. Brackenborough had the longest non-hyphenated name of any player in the history of the league.

Brackenborough played for the Ottawa Grand Trunk from 1915 to 1919, Depot Harbour during the 1919–1920 season, North Bay Trappers from 1920 to 1922, Hamilton Tigers from 1922 to 1924, and the Galt Terriers during 1924–1925 season. He joined the Boston Bruins during the 1925–1926 season. He only played 7 games before retiring due to an eye injury.

Career statistics

Regular season and playoffs

References

External links
 

1897 births
1993 deaths
Boston Bruins players
Canadian ice hockey left wingers
Canadian people of English descent
Ice hockey people from Ontario
Ontario Hockey Association Senior A League (1890–1979) players
Sportspeople from Parry Sound, Ontario
Canadian expatriate ice hockey players in the United States